This is a list of 106 species in the genus Hololepta, clown beetles.

Hololepta species

References